Lingdum Monastery (also Ranka Lingdum or Pal Zurmang Kagyud Monastery) is a Buddhist monastery near Ranka in Sikkim, North East India, about an hour's drive from Gangtok. It was completed in 1999.

It follows the Zurmang Kagyu tradition.

References

External links
 Lingdum Monastery, Ranka

Buddhist monasteries in Sikkim
Karma Kagyu monasteries and temples